Harold E. Puthoff (born June 20, 1936) is an American parapsychologist and electrical engineer. In the 2010s, he co-founded the company To the Stars with Tom DeLonge.

Biography
Puthoff was born in Chicago, Illinois. He receive his BA and MSc in electrical engineering from the University of Florida. In 1967, Puthoff earned a Ph.D. in electrical engineering from Stanford University with a thesis on the topic of the stimulated Raman effect in lasers. He then worked on tunable lasers and electron beam devices, and co-authored (with R. Pantell) Fundamentals of Quantum Electronics (Wiley, 1969), published in English, French, Russian and Chinese. Puthoff published papers on polarizable vacuum (PV) and stochastic electrodynamics.

He took an interest in the Church of Scientology in the late 1960s and reached what was then the top OT VII level by 1971. Puthoff wrote up his "wins" for a Scientology publication, claiming to have achieved "remote viewing" abilities. In 1974, Puthoff also wrote a piece for Scientology's Celebrity magazine, stating that Scientology had given him "a feeling of absolute fearlessness". Puthoff severed all connection with Scientology in the late 1970s.

In the 1970s and '80s Puthoff directed a program at SRI International to investigate paranormal abilities, collaborating with Russell Targ in a study of the purported psychic abilities of Uri Geller, Ingo Swann, Pat Price, Joseph McMoneagle and others, as part of what they called the Stargate Project. Both Puthoff and Targ became convinced Geller and Swann had genuine psychic powers, however Geller had employed sleight of hand tricks.

Business ventures 
In 1985, Puthoff founded a for-profit company, EarthTech International in Austin, Texas. At about the same time, he founded an organization, Institute for Advanced Studies at Austin (IASA), which he directed. IASA, funded by anonymous donors, pursues ideas Puthoff finds interesting related to energy generation and propulsion.

Puthoff and EarthTech were granted a US Patent in 1998, with claims that information could be transmitted through a distance using a modulated potential with no electric or magnetic field components. These claims are generally considered to be false, and no such transmitter has been constructed. The case is used for educational purposes in patent law as an example of a valid patent for an inoperable invention. According to the Wisconsin Law School case study, "The lesson of the Puthoff patent is that in a world where both types of patents are more and more common, even a competent examiner may fail to distinguish innovation from pseudoscience."

Parapsychology and pseudoscience 
Uri Geller was studied by Russell Targ and Puthoff at the Stanford Research Institute (SRI). Targ and Puthoff declared to have demonstrated that Geller had genuine psychic powers, though it was reported that there were flaws with the controls in the experiments and Geller was caught using sleight of hand on many other occasions. According to Terence Hines:

Psychologists David Marks and Richard Kammann attempted to replicate Targ and Puthoff's remote viewing experiments. In a series of thirty-five studies, they were unable to replicate the results. While investigating the procedure of the original experiments, Marks and Kammann discovered that the notes given to the judges in Targ and Puthoff's experiments contained clues as to which order they were carried out. Examples included referring to yesterday's two targets, or the inclusion of the date of the session written at the top of the page. They concluded that these clues were the reason for the experiment's high hit rates. Terence Hines has written:

Marks noted that when the cues were eliminated the results fell to a chance level. James Randi noted that controlled tests by several other researchers, eliminating several sources of cuing and extraneous evidence present in the original tests, produced negative results. Students were also able to solve Puthoff and Targ's locations from the clues that had inadvertently been included in the transcripts.

Marks and Kamman concluded: "Until remote viewing can be confirmed in conditions which prevent sensory cueing the conclusions of Targ and Puthoff remain an unsubstantiated hypothesis." According to Martin Gardner, Puthoff (and Targ) "imagined they could do research in parapsychology but instead dealt with 'psychics' who were cleverer than they were".

Puthoff's personal institute has also researched purported applications of zero-point energy. Massimo Pigliucci and others have noted that extracting energy from zero-point energy is considered to be a pseudoscience. Pigliucci wrote "Harold Puthoff [is] a well-known parapsychologist and conducts research on so-called zero point energy, the idea that one can extract energy from empty space — a proposition, I should add, that violates basic principles of thermodynamics and that is considered pseudoscience by credentialed physicists."

Publications

Peer-reviewed papers

References

Further reading
Henry Gordon (1988). Extrasensory Deception: ESP, Psychics, Shirley MacLaine, Ghosts, UFOs. Macmillan of Canada.

External links

 Profile at Earthtech International

1936 births
Living people
21st-century American physicists
United States Navy officers
Parapsychologists
Pseudoscientific physicists
Stanford University alumni
Remote viewers
American former Scientologists
University of Florida alumni
Place of birth missing (living people)
American electrical engineers
20th-century American engineers
People from Chicago